Zion is a placename in the Hebrew Bible used as a synonym for Jerusalem, and for the Land of Israel.

Zion may also refer to:

Religion
 Zion (Latter Day Saints), used to connote an association of the righteous
 Zion (Rastafari), an ideal to which Rastafarians aspire
 Zion Christian Church, an African initiated church in Southern Africa
 Zion Bible College, now Northpoint Bible College, in Haverhill, Massachusetts, U.S.
 Zion College, in Chattanooga, Tennessee, U.S.
 Zion Church (disambiguation)

Arts, entertainment and media

Music
 Zion, half of Zion & Lennox, a Puerto Rican reggaeton duo 
 Zion I, an American hip-hop group
 Zion (Hillsong United album), 2013
 Zion (Phil Keaggy album), 2000
 Zion, a 2014 album by Savant (musician)
 Zion (song), a 1973 demo by David Bowie
 "Zion", a 1999 composition for orchestra by Dan Welcher
 "Zion", a 1963 song by Laurel Aitken
 "Slap It", a 2001 song by Fluke, featured on the soundtrack for The Matrix Reloaded as "Zion"

Other uses in arts, entertainment and media
 Zion (The Matrix), a fictional city in the Matrix series
 Zion, a fictional space station in the novel Neuromancer
 Zion, a character in 2009 French-Israeli drama film Zion and His Brother
 Zion (film), a 2018 short documentary
 Zion (journal), a former academic journal

Places

Canada
 Zion, Northumberland County, Ontario
 Zion, Peterborough County, Ontario

Jerusalem 
Mount Zion, a hill in Jerusalem

United States 
 Zion, Alabama
 Zion, Arkansas
 Zion, Illinois
 Zion station
 Zion Township, Lake County, Illinois
 Zion, Maryland
 Zion Township, Stearns County, Minnesota
 Zion, Missouri
 Zion, New Jersey
 Zion, Oklahoma
 Zion, Pennsylvania
 Zion, South Carolina
 Zion Crossroads, Virginia
 Zion, West Virginia
 Zion, Wisconsin
 Zion National Park, in Utah
Zion Canyon

Elsewhere 
 Zion, Saint Kitts and Nevis
 Zion, the German name for a village in Prussia that is now called Wilenko, Poland

Other uses
 Zion Wildlife Gardens, now Kamo Wildlife Sanctuary in New Zealand
 Zion (name), people with the given and surname of Zion

See also

 Mount Zion (disambiguation)
 Scion (disambiguation)
 Sion (disambiguation)
 Sioni (disambiguation)
 Syon (disambiguation)
 Xion (disambiguation)
 Zion Hill (disambiguation)
 Zionism, the Jewish nationalist movement
 Zionism (disambiguation)
 Zionites (Germany), an 18th century religious sect in Germany
 Zeon, originally romanized as Zion 1998 in the anime television series Mobile Suit Gundam